Brandon Hall station is a light rail stop on the MBTA Green Line C branch in Brookline, Massachusetts. The station's name is an anachronism, as it was named for Brandon Hall, a large hotel built in 1904 just south of the station which burned down on April 26, 1946, after housing 400 SPARS during World War II.

Brandon Hall station has two side platforms serving the line's two tracks. It is not accessible, although a wheelchair lift allows accessible passage between the two elevations of the two halves of Beacon Street at the station. With 356 daily passengers by a 2011 count, Brandon Hall was the second-least-used stop on the C branch after .

Track work in 2018–19, which included replacement of platform edges at several stops, triggered requirements for accessibility modifications at those stops. By December 2022, design for Brandon Hall and seven other C Branch stations was 15% complete, with construction expected to take place in 2024.

References

External links

MBTA - Brandon Hall
Station from Google Maps Street View

Green Line (MBTA) stations
Railway stations in Brookline, Massachusetts